This is a list of operas by the German composer Paul Hindemith (1895–1963).

List

References
Skelton, Geoffrey (1992), 'Hindemith, Paul' in The New Grove Dictionary of Opera, ed. Stanley Sadie (London) 

Werkverzeichnis on the homepage of Fondation Hindemith: 
http://www.hindemith.info/leben-werk/werkverzeichnis

Lists of operas by composer
 
Lists of compositions by composer